Hignell is a surname. Notable people with the surname include:

Alastair Hignell (born 1955), English rugby union player, cricketer, and commentator
Andrew Hignell (born 1959), English cricket writer
Antony Hignell (born 1928), English cricketer and javelin thrower

See also
Hagnell